Crumlin United Football Club is a Northern Irish, intermediate football club playing in the Premier Division of the Northern Amateur Football League. The club is based in Crumlin, County Antrim, was founded in 1968 and played in the Lisburn League, Ballymena Premier League and Dunmurry League before joining the Amateur League in 1986. In 1990, intermediate status was achieved.

Crumlin United have several youth teams who play in the South Belfast Youth League.

Origin
Crumlin United was founded by John Henry, Jimmy Wilson and Billy Friars in 1967 when they entered their first team in the Lisburn League Second Division under the name of Ulster Woolen Mills. The aforementioned company provided the team with a pitch for the season. The closure of UWM the following year saw the team disband, only to resurrect itself in June 1968 in the Crumlin British Legion Hall, this time as Crumlin United.

Honours

Intermediate honours
Northern Amateur Football League: 1
1994–95
Border Cup: 1
2000–01

Junior honours
County Antrim Junior Shield: 1
1985–86

Notes

External links
 Crumlin United  – The homepage of the Crumlin United Youth and Ladies football team
 nifootball.co.uk – (For fixtures, results and tables of all Northern Ireland amateur football leagues)

Association football clubs in Northern Ireland
Association football clubs established in 1968
Northern Amateur Football League clubs
1968 establishments in Northern Ireland